GBA-13 (Astore-I) is a constituency of Gilgit Baltistan Assembly which is currently represented by Khalid Khurshid of Pakistan Tehreek-e-Insaf.

Members

Election results

2009 
Abdul Hameed Khan, an independent politician, became a member of the assembly by getting 3,771 votes.

2015 
Farman Ali of Pakistan Muslim League (N) won this seat by getting 5,942 votes.

2020 
Khalid Khurshid of Pakistan Tehreek e Insaf won this seat by getting 6,089 votes.

References 

Gilgit-Baltistan Legislative Assembly constituencies